A tornado is a violent rotating column of air that touches the surface of the earth.

Tornado may also refer to:

Places
Tornado, West Virginia, a census-designated place, United States

People
 Tornado Alicia Black, a tennis player
 Danie Brits, a South African professional wrestler who used to go by the ring name Tornado
 Steve Debbes, a South African professional wrestler who goes by the ring name Tornado
 Tony Drago, a snooker player nicknamed "The Tornado"  
 Ted Fujita (1920–1998), prominent severe storms researcher, referred to as Mr Tornado by associates and the media

Amusement rides
 Tornado (Adventureland), a wooden roller coaster in Altoona, Iowa, US
 Tornado (Coney Island), a 1920s hybrid rollercoaster in New York, US
 Tornado (Parque de Atracciones de Madrid), a steel coaster in Madrid, Spain
 Tornado (ProSlide ride), a type of water slide
 Tornado (Särkänniemi), an inverted steel roller coaster in Tampere, Finland
 Tornado (Wisdom ride), an amusement ride manufactured by Wisdom Industries Ltd
 Tornado, a steel sit down spinning coaster at Dyrehavsbakken, Denmark
 Tornado, a steel coaster in Scotland, UK manufactured by Pinfari

Arts and entertainment

Characters
 Tornado (horse), sometimes spelled Toronado, Zorro's horse 
 Tornado, a character from NX Files
 Terrible Tornado, a character from the web comic / manga series One Punch-Man

Film
 The Tornado (1917 film), an American short film by John Ford
 The Tornado, (1924 film), an American silent drama film directed by King Baggot 
 Tornado (film), a 1943 American film directed by William A. Berke
 Tornado: The Last Blood, a 1983 Italian war film
 Tornado!, a 1996 television disaster film

Games
 Tornado (1993 video game), flight simulator game
 Tornado (2008 video game), Nintendo DS game
 Tornado (table football), a table football table

Literature
 Tornado (comics), a 1979 weekly British comic
 Tornado (novel), a 1996 children's book by Betsy Byars

Music

Groups and labels
 The Tornados or The Tornadoes, a 1960s English instrumental band
 The Tornadoes, an American surf band 1960–2007

Albums
 Tornado (Little Big Town album) or the title song (see below), 2012
 Tornado (The Rainmakers album), 1988
 Tornado, by Mandoza, or the title song, 2002

Songs
 "Tornado" (song), by Little Big Town, 2012
 "T.O.R.N.A.D.O.", by the Go! Team from Rolling Blackouts, 2011
 "Tornado", by Adema on the album Planets, 2005
 "Tornado", by Anttix, 2013
 "Tornado", by Sara Groves on the album All Right Here, 2002
 "Tornado", by Steve Aoki with Tiësto, 2011

Television
 "Tornado" (Beavis and Butt-Head), an episode
 "Tornado" (Superstore), an episode
 "Tornado", a commercial for the Buick Rendezvous

Brands and enterprises
 Tornado Mart, a Japanese men's clothing retailer
 Tornados, a frozen snack food by Ruiz Foods

Computing and technology
 Tornado (robot), a competitor on the UK television series Robot Wars
 Tornado (web server), software written in Python
 HTC Tornado, smartphone

Military 
 9A52-4 Tornado, a Russian multiple rocket launcher
 Tornado-G, improved BM-21 Grad multiple rocket launcher
 Tornado-U, improved BM-27 Uragan multiple rocket launcher
 Tornado-S, improved BM-30 Smerch multiple rocket launcher
 BM-30 Smerch (“Tornado”), a Russian multiple rocket launcher
 Panavia Tornado, a Western strike fighter
 Tornado battalion, a former Ukrainian special volunteer unit, disbanded with dishonour in 2015

Sports

Association football
 Niger Tornadoes F.C., soccer club based in Minna, Nigeria 
 Tornados de Humacao, Puerto Rican football club
 Tornado Måløy FK, Norwegian football club
 Tulsa Tornados, former professional soccer team from Tulsa, Oklahoma
 Twin Cities Tornado, initial name of the defunct Twin Cities Phoenix team
 Wichita Tornado, a soccer club in Wichita, Kansas, United States
 Xgħajra Tornadoes F.C., football club from Xgħajra, Malta

Basketball
 Tornado, the supporters of KK Zadar basketball club
 Nippon Tornadoes, Japanese basketball team
 Troon Tornadoes, Scottish basketball club

Ice Hockey
 Huntsville Tornado, former professional ice hockey team
 Texas Tornado, a Junior-A hockey team in Frisco, Texas, United States
 Tornado Luxembourg, an ice hockey team in Luxembourg City

Rugby
 Ballymore Tornadoes, former Australian rugby union football club 
 Eastern Tornadoes, were a New Zealand rugby league franchise
 Thornton Heath Tornadoes, junior Rugby League club based in Croydon, London

Other uses in sports
 Tornado (bull), a ProRodeo Hall of Fame and Bull Riding Hall of Fame bucking bull
 Chicago Tornadoes, a professional cricket franchise
 Golden Tornadoes, various sports teams of Geneva College
 Racine Legion/Tornadoes or Orange/Newark Tornadoes, now-defunct National Football League teams
 Tornado Kick, another name for the Jump inside kick martial arts move
 Worcester Tornadoes, a minor-league baseball club in Worcester, Massachusetts, United States

Transport

Aviation
 Airfer Tornado,  a Spanish paramotor design
 Beardmore Tornado, a diesel airship engine fitted to the R101  
 Hawker Tornado, an unsuccessful World War II single–seat British fighter aircraft
 North American B-45 Tornado, an American bomber aircraft 
 Panavia Tornado, a family of modern, twin–engine military aircraft built in Italy, the UK and Germany
 Panavia Tornado ADV or Panavia Tornado Air Defence Variant, an interceptor aircraft
 Partenavia Tornado, Italian, racing aircraft; only one built 
 Titan Tornado, ultralight aircraft
 Vultee XP-68 Tornado, a proposed version of the XP-54 Swoose Goose
 Wright R-2160 Tornado, aircraft engine

Maritime
 , a high performance catamaran, formerly an Olympic sailing class
 HMS Tornado, World War I, Royal Navy R-class destroyer (1916)
 , United States Coast Guard, Cyclone-class patrol ship. Formerly the US Navy, USS Tornado (PC-14)
 
 Tornado (P-44), a Meteoro-class patrol ship

Rail
 Tornado, a GWR 3031 Class locomotive built for the Great Western Railway between 1891 and 1915
 Tornado, one of the GWR Iron Duke Class, later Rover Class, steam locomotives
 BR Standard Class 7 70022 Tornado, built at Crewe 1951, withdrawn 1967
 LNER Peppercorn Class A1 60163 Tornado, a new–build main line steam locomotive, built in the UK, that entered service in 2008
 South Devon Railway Tornado class a class of broad-gauge, tank locomotive. In service 1854-1885

Road
 Tornado (car company), a British automobile manufacturer active in the late 1950s and early 1960s
 Tornado, one of several models of Benelli motorcycles (see List of Benelli motorcycles)
 Chevrolet Tornado, the name given to the light pickup Chevrolet Montana in countries such as Mexico
 FPV F6 Tornado, an automobile built in Australia by Ford Performance Vehicles from 2005 to 2008
 Tornado Fuel Saver, an after-market device that is claimed to improve fuel economy

See also
Toronado (disambiguation)
Tournado (disambiguation)
Tournedo